Juan Carlos García Pérez de Arce (born 3 January 1971) is a Chilean architect and politician who has been serving as Chile's Minister of Public Works since 11 March 2022.

Biography
The son of Carlos Alberto García Lazcano and María Isabel Pérez de Arce Antoncich, Juan Carlos did a BA in architecture at the Pontifical Catholic University of Valparaíso (PUCV). Later, García completed a MA in urban management at the École Nationale des Ponts et Chaussées in Paris, France.

Within his career, García has worked in the Ministry of Housing and Urban Development (Minvu), a position from which he actively collaborated in the declaration of the Valparaíso commune as a Unesco World Heritage Site.

He has also been an advisor to the Production Development Corporation (Corfo), a site where he promoted programs that aimed to encourage private investment in the Valparaíso Region.

Political career
García is a member of the Liberal Party (PL). In 2020, he participated in the Broad Front primaries for Governor Candidate of the Valparaíso Region, in which he was not elected.

On 21 January 2022, he was appointed as Minister of Public Works by then President-elect Gabriel Boric. García will officially assume the position on 11 March.

Personal life
García is married to Xochitl Poblete, with whom he has two children.

References

External links
 

Living people
1971 births
Chilean architects
21st-century Chilean politicians
Liberal Party of Chile (2013) politicians
Pontifical Catholic University of Valparaíso alumni
École des Ponts ParisTech alumni
Chilean Ministers of Public Works